Prarthana Indrajith (born 29 October 2004) is an Indian playback singer. She predominantly works in the Malayalam film industry, and has also sung in Tamil and Hindi films. Her debut performance was the song "Ko Ko Kozhi" which she sang in the Malayalam film The Great Father.

Early life and family

She is the elder daughter to actors Indrajith Sukumaran and Poornima Indrajith. 
Her grandparents Sukumaran and Mallika Sukumaran, and her uncle Prithviraj Sukumaran are also actors.

Discography

Awards and nominations

References

Indian women playback singers
Singers from Kerala
Malayalam playback singers
Film musicians from Kerala
21st-century Indian women singers
21st-century Indian singers
Women musicians from Kerala
Living people
2004 births
Indian Hindus